Mt. Nebo is one of the 31 barangays of Valencia City, Bukidnon.
It includes the sitios of Hillside, Handuman, Tama-ing, Migtulod,
MVC, Mirasol, Hillside 2. It is bounded by Lurogan in the east, Lilingayon in the northwest, the municipality of Lantapan in the north, and Tugaya in the south.

References

Barangays of Valencia, Bukidnon